Haste is a railway station located in Haste, Germany. The station is located on the Hanover–Minden railway and the Deister Railway. The train services are operated by Deutsche Bahn and WestfalenBahn. The station is also served by the Hanover S-Bahn.

The S1 service operates a circle through Hannover and finishes here. The service also calls here when operating from Hannover out to Minden.

Train services
The station is served by the following services:

Regional services  Rheine - Osnabrück - Minden - Hanover - Braunschweig
Regional services  Bielefeld - Herford - Minden - Hanover - Braunschweig
Hannover S-Bahn services  Minden - Haste - Wunstorf - Hanover - Weetzen - Haste
Hannover S-Bahn services  Nienburg - Wunstorf - Hanover - Weetzen - Haste

References

External links 
 

Railway stations in Lower Saxony
Hannover S-Bahn stations